Līvbērze parish is an administrative unit of Jelgava Municipality in the Semigallia region of Latvia. Prior to the 2009 administrative reforms it was part of the Jelgava District

Towns, villages and settlements of Līvbērze parish 
  – parish administrative center

Notable people from 
 Kārlis Ozols-Priednieks (1896 July 1943).

References 

Parishes of Latvia
Jelgava Municipality
Semigallia